Luiza Yara Lopes Silva (September 8, 1982) better known as Yzalú, is a Brazilian singer, songwriter and guitar. She drew attention when interpreting the song "Mulheres Negras" (2012). With the participation of the rapper Eduardo, evidencing the reality of the women in Brazil, the music became symbol of the black feminism in the country.

Career
Yzalú was born in São Bernardo do Campo, São Paulo, Brazil on September 8, 1982. Yzalú began her career at age 16 when she lived in Salvador, Bahia, improving her knowledge of the guitar. Her influence comes from the American rapper Lauryn Hill, one of the greatest rap artists of the 1990s.

In 2003, Yzalú began performing in bars and ballads in São Paulo interpreting MPB's hits. She was invited to join the female rap group of São Bernardo do Campo Essência Black, formed by Regiane Oliveira and Elisângela Oliveira, starting to perform in theaters in the city, partnering with other artists in the region, such as hip hop group Ordem Própria.

In 2005, the artist had to leave the music to dedicate herself to work and studies to be able to keep up. She studied marketing at the Methodist University and in 2008 decided to return to music motivated by her brother who influenced the idea of making some homemade videos in the staircase of Jardim Farina neighborhood of her hometown singing classic Brazilian hip hop.

In 2012, she was invited to participate in the DVD of the rap group Detentes do Rap. With the participation of several Brazilian artists such as Mano Brown, Eduardo, Dexter, DBS & A Quadrilha, Realidade Cruel and Ferréz.

In 2016, Yzalú released her first CD titled, "Minha Bossa É Treta", produced by Marcelo Sanches, the album transits in MPB, Samba, Jazz and Bossa Nova.

In 2016, in a presentation at Sesc in São Paulo, where she sang a song "Figura Difícil" with the name of rapper Sabotage, the song was released on the newly released album.

Discography

Studio albums
Minha Bossa É Treta (2016)

References

External links 

 at Discogs

1982 births
Living people
Brazilian rappers
Brazilian women composers
21st-century composers
Brazilian women rappers
Afro-Brazilian women singers
Brazilian women singer-songwriters
Brazilian singer-songwriters
Brazilian women guitarists
People from São José dos Campos
21st-century guitarists
21st-century women composers
21st-century women guitarists